Cellvibrio diazotrophicus is a Gram-negative, rod-shaped, aerobic and nitrogen-fixing bacterium from the genus of Cellvibrio which has been isolated from the rhizosphere of the plants Plantago winteri and Hordeum secalinum near Münzenberg in Germany.

References

Pseudomonadales
Bacteria described in 2014